The Second Greceanîi Cabinet was the Cabinet of Moldova from 10 June to 25 September 2009. It was the second government of Zinaida Greceanîi who was Prime Minister of Moldova from 2008 to 2009.

Cabinet of Ministers  

The composition of the cabinet was as follows: 

 

 

 
 
Moldova cabinets
2009 establishments in Moldova
2009 disestablishments in Moldova
Cabinets established in 2009
Cabinets disestablished in 2009